List of Municipalities in Cundinamarca Department:
  
 Agua de Dios
 Albán, Cundinamarca
 Anapoima
 Anolaima
 Apulo
 Arbeláez
 Beltrán, Cundinamarca
 Bituima
 Bojacá
 Cabrera, Cundinamarca
 Cachipay, Cundinamarca
 Cajicá
 Caparrapí
 Cáqueza
 Carmen de Carupa
 Chaguaní
 Chipaque
 Choachí
 Chocontá
 Chía, Cundinamarca
 Cogua
 Cota
 Cucunubá
 El Colegio
 El Peñón
 El Rosal, Cundinamarca
 Facatativá
 Fómeque
 Fosca, Cundinamarca
 Funza
 Fusagasugá
 Fúquene
 Gachalá
 Gachancipá
 Gachetá
 Gama, Cundinamarca
 Girardot, Cundinamarca
 Granada, Cundinamarca
 Guachetá
 Guaduas
 Guasca
 Guataquí
 Guatavita
 Guayabal de Síquima
 Guayabetal
 Gutiérrez, Cundinamarca
 Jerusalén, Cundinamarca
 Junín, Cundinamarca
 La Calera, Cundinamarca
 La Mesa, Cundinamarca
 La Palma, Cundinamarca
 La Peña, Cundinamarca
 La Vega, Cundinamarca
 Lenguazaque
 Machetá
 Madrid, Cundinamarca
 Manta, Cundinamarca
 Medina, Cundinamarca
 Mosquera, Cundinamarca
 Nariño, Cundinamarca
 Nemocón
 Nilo, Cundinamarca
 Nimaima
 Nocaima
 Pacho
 Paime
 Pandi, Cundinamarca
 Paratebueno
 Pasca
 Puerto Salgar
 Pulí, Cundinamarca
 Quebradanegra
 Quetame
 Quipile
 Ricaurte, Cundinamarca
 San Antonio del Tequendama
 San Bernardo, Cundinamarca
 San Cayetano, Cundinamarca
 San Francisco, Cundinamarca
 San Juan de Rioseco
 Sasaima
 Sesquilé
 Sibaté
 Silvania
 Simijaca
 Soacha
 Sopó
 Subachoque
 Suesca
 Supatá
 Susa, Cundinamarca
 Sutatausa
 Tabio
 Tausa
 Tena, Cundinamarca
 Tenjo
 Tibacuy
 Tibiritá
 Tocaima
 Tocancipá
 Topaipí
 Ubalá
 Ubaque
 Ubaté
 Une
 Útica
 Venecia, Cundinamarca
 Vergara, Cundinamarca
 Vianí
 Villagómez
 Villapinzón
 Villeta, Cundinamarca
 Viotá
 Yacopí
 Zipacón
 Zipaquirá

References
 Government of Cundinamarca; Municipalities

Cundinamarca
 
Cundinamarca Municipalities